Gnorimoschema ericoidesi is a moth in the family Gelechiidae. It was described by Powell and Povolný in 2001. It is found in North America, where it has been recorded from California.

The larvae possibly feed on Ericameria ericoides.

References

Gnorimoschema
Moths described in 2001